Freedom Monument is a monument in Bydgoszcz commemorating both the fallen Soviet and Polish soldiers who fought during the liberation of the city in January 1945, and the return of Bydgoszcz to Poland on 20 January 1920.

The monument has a shape of an obelisk. At the base is a plaque with the inscription: "'Libera Civitas Bydgostiensis'" (City of Bydgoszcz Free). On the front wall of the monument are reliefs and plaques, and on other walls, among others, stands tombstone commemorating eleven Soviet soldiers killed .

History 

Shortly after Nazis withdrew from Bydgoszcz in January 1945, corpses of soldiers killed in the fighting for the city needed a place to be buried. Those men from the Red Army were led by colonel Grigorij Bolszanin. The place of the burial was located near the spot where until 1919 stood the statue of Emperor William I on his horse.

An earthen mound covered the tombstone, then the Interim Municipal Government decided to celebrate here the memory of all Red Army and Polish Army soldiers who died in the battles in Bydgoszcz. Thus in spring of 1945, a committee for the construction of the monument was conveyed, chaired by the president of the city, Witold Szukszta. The first draft of the project was presented on 14 April 1945: the work was commissioned to the architect Jan Kossowski, who realized a simple, soaring obelisk, showing the "Slavs triumph over Germany".

The monument, called "Monument of Gratitude to Soldiers of the Red Army" was unveiled on 7 November 1945, It was dedicated to honor the soldiers of the Red Army who died during the liberation of the city and the surrounding area in January 1945. On the obelisk on the front pedestal was placed a plaque with the emblem of the city. 
The inscription in Polish and Russian, was informing about the incident. Before the monument was a tombstone with the names of Soviet officers who were killed in 1945 and buried in this spot. The obelisk was then considered as temporary, waiting to be replaced by the construction of a more worthy monument.

In September 1948, Municipal authorities established the "Civic Committee for the Construction of the Monument of Gratitude to the Red Army". The competition to design the monument was held at national level, and the date of its unveiling already scheduled for 1 May 1949. The costs were supposed to be covered by collecting public money. Four locations were proposed, and Freedom Square was chosen.
Despite the strenuous efforts of municipal authorities, the project failed to succeed, because of many difficulties: including the fact that collections on the streets, in offices, and institutions, as well as taxes collected during the events organized in the city did not raised enough funds; the problems with selection of the project - the competition received 14 projects, from which the choice of the final one dragged on before deciding on the project of professor Marian Wnuk from the Academy of Fine Arts in Gdańsk; as well as problems with the location - in the background of 2 identified spots were churches (St Peter St Paul church on Freedom Square and Cathedral on Theatre Square), making it a sensitive issue to colocate laic and religious buildings.

Another attempt was made in January 1955. This time the location of the future monument was to be on the Theater Square, the "disturbing" figure of Bydgoszcz cathedral being obscured by double row of tall trees. The costs of the project were to come from public funding. Professor Marian Wnuk was still in charge: her design represented a 4-meter-tall statue surrendering to a Red Army soldier in flapping overcoat, holding a Soviet submachine gun made of sandstone. The whole scene was planned to have a large concrete foundation with steps to enable access to the base.
Although the provided project was funded, and even had a date scheduled for the unveiling on 22 July 1956, this monument was finally not realized, due to the Polish thaw with the reforming period of Władysław Gomułka: mindsets were no longer in favour of such realizations. In addition, the political protests that soon followed decreased even more the enthusiasm not only of the society, but also the municipalities and state will.
Other sculptures have been since abandoned and postponed indefinitely.

As a result, the "Monument in honor of the soldiers of the Red Army in Bydgoszcz" remained under the shape of the 1945 simple obelisk, as we can still see it today.

Freedom Monument 

The end of communist rule in 1989 caused a review to the grounds upon which the monument was initially built.
At the request of the inhabitants of the city, in 1990, Bydgoszcz City Council passed a resolution to rename the Monument of Gratitude to "Freedom Monument". Some reliefs were changed and gradually some supplemented ones were added.
The unveiling and new dedication of the "rebuilt" monument took place on 10 November 1991.

In 1994, following the recommendations of the City Council, a relief of bronze was placed on the front wall of the monument, commemorating the return of Bydgoszcz to the Polish state on 20 January 1920. The scene portrays the greeting to the troops of the Polish Army entering the city on the Old Market square in Bydgoszcz.

The bas-relief is the work of the Polish sculptor Alexander Dętkoś. In 1995, on the left side of the monument (facing the street) were put plaques from the same artist with dates of important events for the city. The tombstone placed on the grave of the 11 Soviet soldiers killed in 1945, remained untouched.

Gallery

See also 

 Bydgoszcz
 Freedom Square in Bydgoszcz
 Gdańska Street, Bydgoszcz
 St Peter's and St Paul's Church, Bydgoszcz
 Casimir the Great Park
 Tenement at Freedom Square 1, Bydgoszcz
  Monuments and sculptures in Bydgoszcz
  Monument to Wilhelm I in Bydgoszcz

References

External links 
  press article in polish

Bibliography 
  
  

Freedom Square in Bydgoszcz
1945 establishments in Poland
Monuments and memorials in Poland
Tourist attractions in Kuyavian-Pomeranian Voivodeship